The 1964 Los Angeles Angels season involved the Angels finishing fifth in the American League with a record of 82 wins and 80 losses, 17 games behind the AL Champion New York Yankees.

Offseason 
 December 2, 1963: Bill Kelso was drafted by the Angels from the Los Angeles Dodgers in the 1963 rule 5 draft.

Regular season

Season standings

Record vs. opponents

Notable transactions 
 April 10, 1964: Jimmy Piersall was signed as a free agent by the Angels.
 May 15, 1964: Art Fowler was released by the Los Angeles Angels.

Roster

Player stats

Batting

Starters by position 
Note: Pos = Position; G = Games played; AB = At bats; H = Hits; Avg. = Batting average; HR = Home runs; RBI = Runs batted in

Other batters 
Note: G = Games played; AB = At bats; H = Hits; Avg. = Batting average; HR = Home runs; RBI = Runs batted in

Pitching

Starting pitchers 
Note: G = Games pitched; IP = Innings pitched; W = Wins; L = Losses; ERA = Earned run average; SO = Strikeouts

Other pitchers 
Note: G = Games pitched; IP = Innings pitched; W = Wins; L = Losses; ERA = Earned run average; SO = Strikeouts

Relief pitchers 
Note: G = Games pitched; W = Wins; L = Losses; SV = Saves; ERA = Earned run average; SO = Strikeouts

Farm system

Notes

References 
1964 Los Angeles Angels team page at Baseball Reference
1964 Los Angeles Angels team page at www.baseball-almanac.com

Los Angeles Angels seasons
Los Angeles Angels season
Los Angeles Angels